is a passenger railway station in the town of Kudoyama, Ito District, Wakayama Prefecture, Japan, operated by the private railway company Nankai Electric Railway.

Lines
Kudoyama Station is served by the Nankai Kōya Line, and is located 52.2 kilometers from the terminus of the line at Shiomibashi Station and 51.5 kilometers from Namba Station.

Station layout
The station consists of two opposed side platforms connected to the station building by a level crossing. The station is unattended.

Platforms

Adjacent stations

History
Kudoyama Station opened on December 25, 1924.

Passenger statistics
In fiscal 2019, the station was used by an average of 566 passengers daily (boarding passengers only).

Surrounding area
 Kudoyama Municipal Kudoyama Junior High School
 Kudoyama Municipal Kudoyama Elementary School
 Sanada-an
 Jison-in

See also
List of railway stations in Japan

References

External links

 Kudoyama Station Official Site

Railway stations in Japan opened in 1924
Railway stations in Wakayama Prefecture
Kudoyama, Wakayama